Lesperon is a commune in the Landes department in Nouvelle-Aquitaine in south-western France.

Geography 
Common located about 30 kilometres from the beaches of the Silver Coast, in the heart of the Landes Forest.

History 
Built on a height protected by a stream below the Vignacq. Its original name was Arrast (of "Arx", that is to say, citadel). Around 1305, Armanieu d'Albret, lord of this parish, asserts his authority by building a castle and a church. It is endowed with an imposing fortified tower-tower, equipped with bretèches, armed with loopholes and breakthrough of machicolations. It is supposed that around this church, there would have been four columns, vestiges gone from a savage. At that time Edward II of England pointed this place to his subjects as a dangerous place because of its important junction on a route to Santiago de Compostela, an important stop from where one can continue by the continuation is by Navarre and Roncesvalles, or by Biscay.

There is also a historical "legend" that says that at the time when Henry IV reigned, there was a hunting lodge where it came from time to time crossing to Pau via Orthez. During a hunt, however a very good rider, he lost his right heel spur which he missed greatly for the continuity of events. Also his desire to be alone, certainly still for a lover of the corner, he returned all his entourage [not clear] who escorted him to this search for his spur. Some say that this spur was of great value in view of the importance and the absolute desire to find it. To this day, the spur in question has never been found.

Place of passage of hunters, robbers and pilgrims of Saint-Jacques-de-Compostela, the place was pointed repeatedly as the village of the spur, hence the name of Lesperon.

Economy 
There is a Chemical factory of the DRT.

Transport 
There are a bus, car, truck, taxi, bike, motorbike.

Sports 
There are a club of Basketball, Rugby.

Twinings 
She does not have twinning

Education 
There are one primary school and Kindergarten

See also
Communes of the Landes department

References

Communes of Landes (department)